Joseph Leo Falvey Jr. (born 1959) is an American lawyer who serves as a judge of the United States Court of Appeals for Veterans Claims.

Education and military service 

Falvey earned his Bachelor of Arts from the University of Notre Dame in 1981. He received his Juris Doctor, cum laude, from Notre Dame Law School in 1987, where he was editor-in-chief of the Journal of College and University Law. He earned a Master of Laws, with honors, from the Judge Advocate General's School of the Army.

He is a 30-year veteran of the United States Marine Corps, having served 14 of those years on active duty. In 2011, Falvey retired from the Marine Corps as the Commander of the Marine Corps' Reserve Legal Support Section. He previously served as a prosecutor, defense counsel, or judge in over 300 trials, and served as an appellate judge on the United States Navy-Marine Corps Court of Criminal Appeals. After the September 11 attacks, he was mobilized in support of Operation Enduring Freedom and served in Afghanistan in 2002.

Legal career 

Falvey served as an Assistant United States Attorney for the Eastern District of Michigan in its national security unit from 2008 to 2011. Before joining the Department of Justice, he was a professor of law at Ave Maria School of Law from 1999 to 2007 and the University of Detroit School of Law from 1994 to 1998, where he taught evidence, trial advocacy, military law, national security law, and criminal law and procedure.

Court of Appeals for Veterans Claims 

On January 23, 2018, President Trump announced his intent to nominate Falvey to an undetermined seat on the United States Court of Appeals for Veterans Claims. On January 24, 2018, his nomination was sent to the United States Senate. He was nominated to the seat vacated by Alan G. Lance Sr., who took senior status on April 30, 2017. Falvey's nomination was referred to the Senate Veterans Affairs Committee. A hearing on his nomination was held on April 11, 2018. His nomination was reported out of committee by a voice vote on April 18, 2018. Falvey was confirmed by voice vote on April 26, 2018.

Personal 

Falvey and his wife, Anne, reside in Plymouth, Michigan, with their youngest 3 children.The older 6 children are living happily in other towns.

References

External links 
 
 Biography at U.S. Court of Appeals for Veterans Claims

1959 births
Living people
20th-century American lawyers
20th-century American judges
21st-century American lawyers
21st-century American judges
Assistant United States Attorneys
Ave Maria School of Law faculty
Judges of the United States Court of Appeals for Veterans Claims
Notre Dame Law School alumni
Recipients of the Legion of Merit
United States Article I federal judges appointed by Donald Trump
United States Marine Corps colonels
University of Detroit Mercy faculty
University of Notre Dame alumni
University of Virginia School of Law alumni
The Judge Advocate General's Legal Center and School alumni